The Mabel Bassett Correctional Center (MBCC) is an Oklahoma Department of Corrections prison for women located in unincorporated Pottawatomie County, Oklahoma, near McLoud.  The facility houses 1241 inmates, most of whom are held at medium security.

The facility first opened in 1974, on Martin Luther King Drive in Oklahoma City.  It was named for Oklahoma political figure Mabel Bassett, who served as the Commission of Charities and Corrections from 1923 to 1947.  It also houses the female death row for the state.

History 

The Oklahoma Women's Treatment Facility first opened in 1974 at 3300 Martin Luther King Drive, and received the name "Mabel Bassett Correctional Center" in November, 1977.

By 2002 the state maintained both the Mabel Bassett Correctional Center, with 337 female prisoners, and a separate facility called the Mabel Bassett Minimum Security Unit (MBMSU), with another 200.  To consolidate this population, the state purchased the former Central Oklahoma Correctional Facility (COCF) in McLoud for just under $40 million.  The facility had been built in 1998, owned by the city of McLoud, and operated by Dominion Correctional Services.

With this move, the state planned to expand and harden the facility, take over Dominion's contract for housing 110 female inmates from Wyoming and Hawaii, and close the prior two sites. The original building on MLK is now part of the headquarters of the Oklahoma Department of Corrections; the former MBMSU near I-44 and the Broadway Extension became the Oklahoma City Community Corrections Center.

Current facility 

MBCC is currently the only facility for women that can house mental health patients, and the Segregated Housing Unit is the only women's unit for inmates on Protective Custody or Death Row.  The current capacity of death row is 1, occupied by Brenda Andrew.

Notable inmates 

Amber Hilberling - Convicted in 2013 of second-degree murder of the June 2011 death of her husband, Josh Hilberling. Hilberling was found dead in her cell in October 2016 of an apparent suicide by hanging. She was 25 years old at the time of her death. Amber’s story was featured on A&E’s “The First 48”  and A&E's Women Who Kill.
Brenda Andrew - On Death Row for the murder of her husband Rob Andrew.

References

7. ^ Kimble, Lindsay (29 October 2016). https://people.com/crime/amber-hilberling-convicted-murderer-hangs-herself/

Prisons in Oklahoma
Women's prisons in the United States
Capital punishment in Oklahoma
Buildings and structures in Pottawatomie County, Oklahoma
1974 establishments in Oklahoma
Women in Oklahoma